Sayverse, is a Latin pop rock band that originated in El Paso, Texas. The current members are Roger Argenis (Guitars), Juan Arellano (Vocals), and Manny Martinez (Drums). Sayverse came together in 2015 to bring a fresh sound to the pop rock scene in Latin America. In 2016, after only 10 months of making music, Sayverse was invited to perform at the Latin Billboards 2016.

In August 2016, the band scored a big success in Mexico with their single, "Decision". Their debut CD titled, "No Soy Yo, Eres Tu" was released on August 26, 2016. Sayverse went on a month long tour of Mexico to promote the album. The tour also included shows with Latin Grammy nominated band, The Chamanas.

References

Latin pop music groups
American Latin musical groups
People from Ciudad Juárez
Mexican pop music groups
Musical groups established in 2015
2015 establishments in Texas